Zimiromus is a genus of ground spiders that was first described by Nathan Banks in 1914.

Species
 the genus Zimiromus contains 41 species:

References

Gnaphosidae
Araneomorphae genera
Spiders of Central America
Spiders of North America
Spiders of South America
Taxa named by Nathan Banks